Ornella Palla (born 30 March 1990)  is a team handball player from Uruguay. She has played on the Uruguay women's national handball team, and participated at the 2011 World Women's Handball Championship in Brazil.

References

1990 births
Living people
Uruguayan female handball players
Handball players at the 2011 Pan American Games
Pan American Games competitors for Uruguay
21st-century Uruguayan women